William Horace Mann (28 July 1878 – 24 February 1938) was an English first-class cricketer who played a single first-class match, for Worcestershire against Hampshire in July 1924. Batting near the bottom of the order he made 4 in the first innings and 3 in the second.

Mann was born in Trowbridge, Wiltshire; he died in Canford Cliffs, Dorset at the age of 59.

He was commissioned a second lieutenant in the Royal Wiltshire Yeomanry (Prince of Wales's Own Royal Regiment) on 16 July 1902.

References

External links
 

1878 births
1938 deaths
English cricketers
Worcestershire cricketers
People from Trowbridge